Fariburz, known in Byzantine sources as Phabrizus, was a 6th-century Iranian military officer from the Mihran family, who served under the Sasanian king Khosrau I (r. 531–579).

Biography 
He was the brother of the diplomat and military officer Izadgushasp. The Byzantine historian Procopius describes them as: "both holding most important offices ... and at the same time reckoned to be the basest of all Persians, having a great reputation for their cleverness and evil ways."

In 548, Fariburz was ordered by Khosrau I to transport the Byzantine prisoners of war captured in the ongoing Lazic War to Iran, where they were to be settled. Some time later, Fariburz, along with another Iranian officer named Pharsanses, at the head of a small army numbering 300, marched to Lazica, where they planned to assassinate the vassal king Gubazes II. However, Pharsanses betrayed the Sasanians and revealed the plan to Gubazes, after which both defected to the Byzantine camp.

Fariburz then instructed the Sasanian garrison of the Lazic fortress of Petra to prepare for a Byzantine siege, and returned to the Sasanian capital of Ctesiphon with his troops. In 549, Fariburz, along with three other commanders and an army numbering 5,000 men, were left in the garrison in Petra by Mihr-Mihroe. However, in a surprise attack, the Byzantine military officer Dagisthaeus and Gubazes managed to defeat Fariburz, who along with the rest of the survivors fled from the country.

In 550, Fariburz suppressed the rebellion of Khosrau's eldest son Anoshazad, and then along with his brother Izadgushasp left Iran on a diplomatic mission to Constantinople. Nothing more is known about Fariburz.

References

Sources

6th-century births
6th-century deaths
6th-century Iranian people
House of Mihran
People of the Roman–Sasanian Wars
Lazic War
Generals of Khosrow I